Allium tschimganicum is a Central Asian species of onion native to Uzbekistan and Kyrgyzstan. The Flora of China regards this name as synonymous with Allium fetisowii Regel. However, other sources accept A. tschimganicum as a distinct species.

References

tschimganicum
Onions
Flora of Central Asia
Plants described in 1923